Fallahabad may refer to:
 Fallahabad, Gilan
 Fallahabad, Razavi Khorasan
 Fallahabad-e Pain, Yazd Province